Vladyslav Voytsekhovskyi (born 19 April 1993) is a Ukrainian professional footballer who plays as a striker for LNZ Cherkasy.

Career
Voytsekhovskyi is a product of the several Kyivan youth academies. His first trainer was Dmytro Makukha.

In 2011, he signed a contract with the Ukrainian Premier League club Dnipro Dnipropetrovsk, but never played in a senior match. In July 2014 he signed a contract with Naftovyk-Ukrnafta Okhtyrka in the Ukrainian First League.

References

External links

1993 births
Living people
Ukrainian footballers
FC Dnipro players
FC Naftovyk-Ukrnafta Okhtyrka players
SC Dnipro-1 players
MFC Mykolaiv players
Association football forwards
Sportspeople from Kyiv Oblast
FC LNZ Cherkasy players
Ukrainian First League players